William Pharis (born April 21, 1981) is a Lebanese American basketball player. He is a six-foot-nine-inch tall (2.06m) forward currently playing with Union Byblos Amchit (UBA) and Lebanon national basketball team.

Pharis attended University of Arkansas. He previously played for Svendborg Rabbits in the Danish League.

Lebanese national team

Pharis joined Lebanon national basketball team in 2010 for the 2010 William Jones Cup in which he averaged 8.17 points, 6.8 rebounds, shooting 55.2% from the floor.

References

1981 births
Living people
Arkansas Razorbacks men's basketball players
Lebanese men's basketball players
Lebanese people of American descent
SMU Mustangs men's basketball players
Power forwards (basketball)
Small forwards
American men's basketball players